Abner Dean (18 March 1910 – 30 June 1982), born Abner Epstein in New York City, was an American cartoonist. In allegorical or surrealist situations, Dean often depicted extremes of human behavior amid grim, decaying urban settings or barren landscapes. His artwork prompted Clifton Fadiman to comment, "His pictures are trick mirrors in which we catch sight of those absurd fragments of ourselves that we never see in the smooth glass of habit."

The nephew of sculptor Jacob Epstein, Dean graduated from Dartmouth College in 1931, and studied at the National Academy of Design. He worked as a commercial illustrator, contributing to The New Yorker, Esquire, and other publications. His work for Life included illustrations of George Orwell's 1984 for a Life article on Orwell.

His first book, It's a Long Way to Heaven (Farrar and Rinehart, 1945) had an introduction by Philip Wylie. Chris Lanier, in "Abner Dean Made This: An Appreciation," analyzed the approach Dean took in the book:

Seven more Dean collections were published over the next 16 years. As indicated by the title of his Naked People (1963), his more personal work portrayed most often unclothed people in a variety of absurdist situations, reflecting the themes of disillusionment, self-delusion, yearning and the meaninglessness of modern life. Despite this, he usually drew in a very slick, professional and cleanly drawn, even cute style. Dean's vision expressed a darkness atypical of cartoon work of his time. He has begun to accumulate a posthumous cult following of admirers.

Collections
It's a Long Way to Heaven (1945)
What Am I Doing Here? (1947); new edition: New York : New York Review Books, [2016], 
And On the Eighth Day (1949)
Come As You Are: A Book about People at Parties (1952)
Cave Drawings for the Future (1954)
Wake Me When It's Over (1955)
Not Far From the Jungle (1956)
Abner Dean's Naked People: A Selection of Drawings from Four of His Books (1963)

References

External links
Comic Art 9 features a long essay on Dean's life and work, with many color images
"Abner Dean Made This: An Appreciation" by Chris Lanier
Small selection of Dean's cartoons
Sovereign Liege: Dean art with comments
 The Papers of Abner Dean at Dartmouth College Library

1910 births
1982 deaths
American cartoonists
Artists from New York City
Dartmouth College alumni
Esquire (magazine) people